Elise van der Horst (born 22 July 1982), better known as EliZe, is a Dutch singer. In 2010 she moved to Los Angeles, California.

Career 

As an eight-year-old she was selected to sing in a children's television show, Kinderen voor Kinderen ("Children for Children"), in which she performed for six years. After that she joined "Non Stop", a teenage choir, and participated in two amateur productions of the musicals Chicago and Les Misérables.

In 2004, EliZe recorded an album in Denmark. The songs were written and produced by Peter Hartmann and Jan Langhoff, who also worked with Aqua. The first single, "Shake", was released in 2004 in the Netherlands. Though the song received the title "Dancesmash!" by Radio 538, the single was a modest hit by peaking at number 32 on the Dutch Top 40. "Automatic (I'm Talking to You)", the second single, was released in 2005 in the Netherlands and also earned the title "Dancesmash!" shortly after its release. The song became her signature song, peaking at number 7 there and becoming her best-selling single to date. It is also the first song that has ever charted outside the Netherlands, charting in Finland and Belgium amongst others in the top 20. Her third single, "I'm No Latino", was released in August 2005, and became a TMF Superclip shortly after its introduction. The song did not perform as well as "Automatic" did, but still managed to peak at number 14 on the Dutch Top 40 and to remain in the chart for 6 weeks.

In 2006 her single "Into Your System" peaked at number 18 in the Dutch Top 40. Following the success of its singles, EliZe released her long-awaited debut album In Control on 29 September 2006 in the Netherlands. The album peaked at number 66 in the Dutch Mega Album Top 100. It was followed by the single "Itsy Bitsy Spider", featuring rapper Jay Colin. It did not perform well in the charts.

In May 2008, she released the first single of her second album, "Lovesick." In Bulgaria she scored a No. 1 hit with it and kept the top position for 6 weeks. This marked her second No. 1 hit in that country. The following singles were "Hot Stuff", a cover version from Donna Summer's song, and "Can't You Feel It?". Her second album More Than Meets the Eye was released on 26 June 2009 in the Netherlands.

In 2007, EliZe hosted the Dutch version of the TV show "Kids Top 20" and won a Nickelodeon Kids' Choice Award for Best Singer while up against Netherlands' No. 1 singer Marco Borsato and Hilary Duff. In 2008 EliZe hosted the first season of the Dutch version of the internationally acclaimed TV show "So You Think You Can Dance".

In 2009, EliZe was voted Holland's Most desirable single woman by winning the Single & Famous Award.

Discography

Albums

Singles

Non-album appearances
Other songs by or with EliZe:

External links
Official website
Fan site

References

1982 births
Living people
Dutch child singers
Dutch dance musicians
Dutch people of Indonesian descent
Dutch pop singers
Musicians from Utrecht (city)
EliZe
21st-century Dutch singers
21st-century Dutch women singers